Michalis Charalambous (born 29 January 1999) is a Cypriot professional footballer who plays as a forward for Anagennisi Deryneia FC.

Career

Ethnikos Achna
Charalambous made his Cypriot First Division debut at the age of 15, starting the match and playing for 45 minutes in Ethnikos Achna's 5–0 victory against AEK Kouklia on 18 May 2014.

APOEL
On 2 February 2015, at the age 16, he moved to Cypriot First Division champions APOEL. He made his official debut on 7 May 2016, coming on as a 71st-minute substitute in APOEL's 0–1 away defeat against Apollon Limassol for the Cypriot First Division.

Honours
APOEL
Cypriot First Division (2): 2015–16, 2016–17

References

External links
 APOEL official profile
 
 Michalis Charalambous 2019-20 stats at CFA

1999 births
Living people
Greek Cypriot people
Cypriot footballers
Cypriot expatriate footballers
Association football forwards
Ethnikos Achna FC players
APOEL FC players
Anagennisi Deryneia FC players
Cypriot First Division players
Liga Portugal 2 players
Cypriot Second Division players
Expatriate footballers in Portugal